Fildu de Jos is a commune located in the southern part of Sălaj County, Transylvania, Romania. Fildu de Jos is the contact point between Almaș Basin, the Meses Mountains and the northern part of the Huedin Basin, and is situated at 57 km from Zalău. It is composed of four villages: Fildu de Jos, Fildu de Mijloc (Középfüld), Fildu de Sus (Felsőfüld) and Tetișu (Ketesd).

Archeological excavations have brought to the surface traces of settlements which existed prior to the Roman occupation. The actual villages were situated along the main cross-roads between the Roman camps in the valley of the river Crișul Repede and Porolissum. Fildu de Jos was attested in 1249 under the name Terra Fyld, Fildu de Sus and Fildu de Mijloc in 1415 and Tetișu in 1399.

Population and climate
At the last census the population counted 1583 inhabitants of which 63.10% were Romanians, 21.22% Hungarians, 15.47% Roma and 0.21% were of other nationalities.

Due to the favourable weather, agriculture is well represented by potato-growing and livestock-breeding.

The picturesque mountainous landscapes and the architectural monuments such as the wooden church "Pogorârea Sfantului Duh" dated from 1727 and entered in the national cultural patrimony, the wooden church "Sfintii Arhangheli" in Fildu de Jos (1630) and the reformed church in Tetișu (14th century) are the main important tourist spectacles worth visiting.

Wooden church of Fildu de Sus

The church was built in 1727 by the artist Freont Nicoara from Agrij and Chendre of Petre Brudului. The painting was executed in 1856 and is very well preserved, but the painter remains unknown. Its central tower stands over 40 m tall. The last renovation was carried out in 1988-1999. It is considered by several authors to be representative of the traditional architecture of this region and is listed on the official list of historic monuments of Romania.

References

Cristache-Panait, Ioana (1978). "Biserica Pogorârea Duhului Sfânt din Fildu de Sus" in Monumente istorice bisericești din Eparhia Ortodoxă Română a Oradei. Biserici de lemn: 317-319, Oradea.
Szinte, Gábor (1913). "A Kolozsmegyei fatemplomok". Értesítöje IX (1-2): 1-31.
Cristache-Panait, Ioana (1971). "Bisericile de lemn din Sălaj" in Buletinul Monumentelor Istorice 1971 (1): 31-40.
Ghergariu, Leontin (1973). "Meșterii construcțiilor monumentale de lemn din Sălaj". AMET 1971-73: 255-273, Cluj.
Godea, Ioan (1996). Biserici de lemn din România (nord-vestul Transilvaniei). Bucharest: Editura Meridiane. .

Communes in Sălaj County
Localities in Transylvania